Virginia's 32nd House of Delegates district elects one of 100 seats in the Virginia House of Delegates, the lower house of the state's bicameral legislature. District 32, in Loudoun County, has been represented by David Reid since 2018. According to the 2010 census, the thirty-second district has a population of 80,268 with 56,252 registered voters.

District officeholders

Electoral history

References

External links
 

Government in Loudoun County, Virginia
Virginia House of Delegates districts